See,
Yabaâna language
Mainatari language